The Bezirk Eisenstadt-Umgebung is an administrative district (Bezirk) in the federal state of Burgenland, Austria.

The area of the district is 455.5 km², with a population of 44,257 (2022), and a population density of 98 persons per km². The administrative center of the district is Eisenstadt, itself a statutory city outside of the district.

Administrative divisions
The district consists of the below municipalities and towns:
 Breitenbrunn (1,907)
 Donnerskirchen (1,745)
 Großhöflein (1,940)
 Hornstein (2,769)
 Klingenbach (1,167)
 Leithaprodersdorf (1,159)
 Loretto (463)
 Mörbisch am See (2,322)
 Müllendorf (1,326)
 Neufeld an der Leitha (3,187)
 Oggau am Neusiedler See (1,807)
 Oslip (1,279)
 Purbach am Neusiedlersee (2,701)
 Sankt Margarethen im Burgenland (2,711)
 Schützen am Gebirge (1,400)
 Siegendorf (2,959)
 Steinbrunn (2,370)
 Stotzing (805)
 Trausdorf an der Wulka (1,908)
 Wimpassing an der Leitha (1,265)
 Wulkaprodersdorf (1,886)
 Zagersdorf (994)
 Zillingtal (926)

See also

 
Districts of Burgenland